The Lost Sons is a 2021 American-British documentary film, directed by Ursula Macfarlane. It follows Paul Fronczak, a man who discovers he had been abandoned as a child and mistakenly returned to another family whose young son was missing. Upon finding out he is not biologically related to his parents, Fronczak sets out to discover his true identity, and the whereabouts of the real Paul Joseph Fronczak.

The film had its world premiere at South by Southwest on March 16, 2021.

Synopsis
The film follows, and is largely narrated by, a man who was raised as "Paul Fronczak" by a Chicago couple whom he was led to believe were his biological parents. Born in 1964, "Paul" stumbled across newspaper clippings at his family home when he was 10 years old. The news reports featured his parents grieving over a kidnapped baby son, then celebrating when he was recovered two years later, apparently abandoned by the kidnapper. In the 2010s, now in his 50s, Paul began an extensive investigation involving DNA tests, private investigators, and tapping into his media contacts for publicity, to determine what really happened. After many twists and turns, he discovers that he was not the kidnapped child, that his real name is Jack Rosenthal (from Atlantic City, New Jersey), that he has a still missing twin sister named Jill, and that the real Paul Fronczak is still alive and known by an adoptive name.

Production
In January 2021, it was announced Ursula Macfarlane would direct the film, with CNN Films and Raw set to produce.

Release
The film had its world premiere at South by Southwest on March 16, 2021.

Reception
The Lost Sons received positive reviews from critics. The review aggregator website Rotten Tomatoes surveyed  and, categorizing the reviews as positive or negative, assessed 16 as positive and 4 as negative for a 80% rating. Among the reviews, it determined an average rating of 6.4 out of 10.

References

External links
 

2020s English-language films
2020s American films
2020s British films
2021 films
2021 documentary films
British documentary films
CNN Films films
Films about child abduction